Julpussar och stjärnsmällar ("Christmas Kisses and Loud Bangs") was the Sveriges Television's Christmas calendar in 1986.

Plot 
Based on Hans-Eric Hellberg's children's books, the story is set in and around the fictional Dalarna village of Busnäs in Sweden.

Rerun 
The series was shown as a rerun at SVT 1 between 21 December 1992 – 28 January 1993.

Video 
The series was released to DVD in 2010.

References

External links 
 

1986 Swedish television series debuts
1986 Swedish television series endings
Sveriges Television's Christmas calendar
Television shows set in Sweden